James Irving Morehouse (6 April 1864 – 2 November 1914) was an Australian rules footballer who played with St Kilda in the Victorian Football League (VFL).

Family
The son of William Morehouse (1829-1904), and Harriet Morehouse (1830-1897), née Merrick, James Irving Morehouse was born in Melbourne on 6 April 1864.

Football
Before moving to Carlton in the VFA, Morehouse played for several years with Prahran -- as did his brother, Arthur William Morehouse (1866-1931), who, in addition to playing with Prahran in 1886 and 1887, also played with St Kilda (1888-1889), Richmond (1890), and Carlton (1891) in the VFA.

Death
He died of pleurisy at the Wagga Wagga Hospital on 2 November 1914.

References

External links 

Blueseum: James "Jigger" Morehouse

1864 births
1914 deaths
Australian rules footballers from Melbourne
Carlton Football Club (VFA) players
Fremantle Football Club (1881–1899) players
St Kilda Football Club players
Deaths from pleurisy